People, primarily female, often report being harassed while running for exercise. Many of the harassment incidents and physical attacks happen during daylight hours. In one nine-day period in 2016, three women were murdered while they were running, drawing attention to this phenomenon.

This list includes people that were murdered while running for exercise.

See also
List of marathon fatalities

References

External links 
 ABC7NEWS: A look back at women murdered while jogging

Lists of murders
Lists of victims of crimes
Lists of people by cause of death